Izmit station is a railway station on the Istanbul-Ankara railway and is the main station in Izmit, Turkey. The station is located on the shore of the Izmit Bay next to the D100 and at the western end of Cumhuriyet avenue.

Izmit station was first opened on 1 August 1873 by the Ottoman government as part of the Constantinople-Izmit railway. The line was then sold to the Anatolian Railway (CFOA) in 1880, which continued to build the line east to Ankara. The Turkish State Railways took over the railway and the station in 1927.

References

External links
 http://www.trainsofturkey.com/w/pmwiki.php/Stations/Izmit
 Başkent Ekspresi
 Fatih Ekspresi
 Boğaziçi Treni
 Anadolu Ekspresi
 Ankara Ekspresi
 İç Anadolu Mavi Treni
 Meram Ekspresi
 Doğu Ekspresi
 Vangölü Ekspresi
 Güney Ekspresi
 Cumhuriyet Ekspresi
 Eskişehir Ekspresi
 Sakarya Ekspresi
 Haydarpaşa-Adapazarı Bölgesel

1873 establishments in the Ottoman Empire
1977 establishments in Turkey
Buildings and structures in İzmit
Railway stations in Kocaeli Province
Railway stations opened in 1873
Railway stations opened in 1977
High-speed railway stations in Turkey